Karolina Micuła (born 16 November 1988 in Rzeszów, Poland) is a Polish singer, songwriter, artist, actress and political activist.

In 2017 Micuła was the winner of the 38th Stage Songs Review Award in Wrocław for her performance of the song "Arahja" by Kult. She was awarded the WARTO award by the Gazeta Wyborcza newspaper for her art activism. As an actress, she has acted on stage at the Capitol Musical Theatre in Wrocław, as well as in several television shows.

She is one of the main coordinators of All-Poland Women's Strike, a women's rights social movement opposed to the ban on abortion in Poland, responsible for cultural issues in its Consultative Council.

References

External links
 
 

Polish women songwriters
Living people
1988 births
Polish abortion-rights activists
Polish feminists
21st-century Polish women singers
21st-century Polish actresses
Polish LGBT singers
Polish LGBT songwriters
Polish LGBT artists
Polish LGBT actors
20th-century Polish LGBT people
21st-century Polish LGBT people